This is a list of episodes from the YTV animated comedy Sidekick.

Series overview

Episodes

Funpak shorts (2005)
The five Funpak shorts were released in 2005 before the idea of turning the shorts into a TV series.

Season 1 (2010-11)
This season contains 26 episodes.

Season 2 (2011–12)
This season contains 14 episodes.

Season 3 (2013)
This season contains 12 episodes. This is also the final season of the series.

References

Sidekick